A gobo is an object placed inside or in front of a light source to control the shape of the emitted light and its shadow.

For studio photography purposes, the term "gobo" has come to refer to any device that casts a shadow, and various pieces of equipment that go in front of a light (such as a gobo arm or gobo head).  

In theatrical lighting, however, the term more specifically refers to a device placed in "the gate" or at the "point of focus" between the light source, called a lamp, and the lenses (or other optics).

Derivation 
The Oxford Dictionary gives three definitions (and others concur): "A dark plate or screen used to shield a lens from light; (in a theatre) a partial screen used in front of a spotlight to project a shape; shield used to mask a microphone from extraneous noise." Though the Oxford provides a possible "1930s ... unknown origin, perhaps from go between", the exact derivation of gobo is unclear. It may be an American slang abbreviation of "go-between", or "go-before" (just as New York's "SoHo" signifies the area "South of Houston Street"). The term can be traced back to the cinema studios of the 1930s. 

Some lighting professionals believe that it is an acronym for "goes before optics" or, less often, "goes between optics". An alternative abbreviation might be "graphical optical black-out". The treatment of the word as an acronym is recent, as alternative to applications in optics, "gobo" may refer to a screen or sheet of sound-absorbent material for shielding a microphone from sounds coming from a particular direction (so therefore contrary to an interpretation that deals with visual "black-out" or "optics"). There are many examples of acoustic gobos. See also Gobo (recording).

Use in studio photography 

In the photographic industry, a "gobo" describes any opaque, usually black, panel, or "flat", of any dimension, that goes between a light source and photographic subject (such as between sun light and a portrait model) to control the modelling effect of the existing light or, used as a "cutter", to create shadows; or even to control reflections; or between light source and lens, to cut flare. Use of gobos augments light-shaping devices attached to the lights themselves, whether continuous or flash, with cones, snoots, honeycomb grids or barn doors being the most common such fittings.

Subtractive 
The use of the gobo is "subtractive", as opposed to using a "reflector" to bounce added light into a shadow (thus "additive" lighting). Use of a gobo subtracts light from a portion of an overall shaded subject and creates a contrast between one side of the subject and the other.

Equipment 
For long shoots on complex sets in the studio more convenient and precise are free-standing boards, often configured as self-supporting hinged door-height panels (usually called "flats"), or if smaller, as a "flag", or a "dot" (a round flag), or a "finger" (larger and rectangular in form) attached to stands, or extending from arms or clamps attached to the tabletop for still-life and product shots. Photographers most often use panels of black foamcore or thick cards. All are devised, or improvised, in different shapes, but are always opaque. The closer the gobo is to the subject, the sharper the shadow. Patent arms with "elbows" that can be oriented in all planes and that can be locked in position are commercially available.

Blocking/reducing light 
The term is also used for panels or screens used to block light from the lens that would otherwise cause flare or degrade contrast.  Such screens as used on films sets may be 3 m tall. The photographer on location might use their lens hood, hand or dark slide for such purpose, but with multiple light sources in the studio a range of separate operable gobos provides tailored solutions.

A gobo may be used even in the case of broad-source light (a softbox, for example) where the problem is to control reflection in a metallic or glass surface, by placing it in front of the diffuser for a hard-edged dark reflection, or behind, to produce a soft outline.

Use in designing an event 

It is becoming more and more popular for designers and decorators to use gobo for their event design. It can relate to the theme, colours or decor of the event. It is also very effective way to get rid of the old traditional way using poster to display some logo or focus point. It is certainly an amazing way to fill in the dance floor or walls with a pattern.

Use in theatre 

Gobos are used with projectors and simpler light sources to create lighting scenes in theatrical applications. Simple gobos, incorporated into automated lighting systems, are popular at nightclubs and other musical venues to create moving shapes. Gobos may also be used for architectural lighting, as well as in interior design, as in projecting a company logo on a wall.

Placement in "the gate" or at the "point of focus" is important because it produces a crisp, sharp-edged pattern or design (of logos, fine detail, architecture, etc.). Lighting designers typically use them with stage lighting instruments to manipulate the shape of the light cast over a space or object—for example, to produce a pattern of leaves on a stage floor. Gobos placed after the optics do not produce a finely focused image, and are more precisely called "flags" or "cucoloris" ("cookies").

Materials
Gobos are made of various materials. Common types include steel, glass, and plastic.

Steel gobos or metal gobos use a metal template from which the image is cut out. These are the most sturdy, but often require modifications to the original design—called bridging—to display correctly. To correctly represent the letter "O", for example, requires small tabs or bridges to support the opaque center of the letter. These can be visible in the projected image, which might be undesirable in some applications.

Glass gobos are made from clear glass with a partial mirror coating to block the light and produce "black" areas in the projected image. This eliminates any need for bridging and accommodates more intricate images. Glass gobos can also include colored areas (much like stained glass windows), whether by multiple layers of dichroic glass (one for each color) glued on an aluminium or chrome-coated monochrome gobo, or by newer technologies that vary the thickness of the dichroic coating (and therefore the color) in a controlled way on a single piece of glass—which makes it possible to turn a color photo into a glass gobo. Glass gobos generally offer the highest image fidelity, but are the most fragile. Glass gobos are typically created with laser ablation or photo etching.

Plastic gobos or transparency gobos can be used in LED ellipsoidal spotlights. These "LED-only" plastic gobos can be full-color (like a glass gobo), but are far less delicate. They are new to the market, as are LED lights, and their durability and effectiveness vary between brands.

In the past, plastic gobos were generally custom-made for when a pattern requires color and glass does not suffice. However, in a "traditional" (tungsten-halogen) light fixture, the focus point position of a gobo is extremely hot, so these thin plastic films require special cooling elements to prevent melting. A lapse in the cooling apparatus, even for seconds, can ruin a plastic gobo in a tungsten-halogen lighting instrument.

Patterns

Theatrical and photographic supply companies manufacture many simple and complex stock patterns. They also can produce custom gobos from customer artwork. Generally, a lighting designer chooses a pattern from a manufacturer's catalog. Because of the large number of gobos available, they are generally referred to by number, not name. Lighting technicians can also hand-cut custom gobos out of sheet metal stock, or even aluminum pie pans.

Gobos are often used in weddings and corporate events. They can project company logos, the couple's names, or just about any artwork. Some companies can turn a custom gobo out in as little as a week. Designers also use "stock" gobo patterns for these events—for example, for projecting stars or leaves onto the ceiling.

Mechanics/optics

The gobo is placed in the focal plane of the lantern (generally an ellipsoidal reflector spotlight or a moving head).  The gobo is inserted upside-down and back-to-front. The lighting instrument inverts the projected image.

Common sizes

See also

 Bat-Signal
 Gobo (recording)

References

Photographic lighting
Photography equipment
Stage lighting
Stage terminology